Alison Holloway (born 1961) is an English journalist and producer, now living in the United States. She was the original presenter of Sky Television's Sky World News Tonight and is now a network television entertainment show producer based in Los Angeles.

Early career
Born in London, Holloway began her television career at the age of 17 as a continuity announcer and newsreader at Westward Television. She then went to HTV West in Bristol, at first, joining the company as a reporter-presenter, then, anchoring HTV News. Holloway remained with the station through most of the 1980s, combining her news duties with presenting many other local programmes for HTV West, including the Good Neighbour Show and the networked Animal Express.

She co-presented ITV's Olympic Games coverage in 1988, and moved to Sky at the launch of Sky News in 1989. She helped launch the Southeast edition of Meridian Tonight in 1993. She also hosted the current affairs show Newsline, as well as numerous news, game, and quiz shows, and was correspondent for the 1994 Whitbread Round the World Yacht Race and ITV’s Rugby World Cup, and London-based correspondent for the American syndicated newsmagazines Hard Copy (Paramount Television) and A Current Affair (Fox).

In 1994, she moved from Britain to America to anchor a news magazine, Premier Story and covered the O. J. Simpson murder case and trial. Remaining in Los Angeles, she later hosted programmes for Court TV, ABC, UPN, Showtime and other channels.

Network producer
As of August 2015, Holloway was co-executive producer of Little Big Shots, an NBC variety series produced by Warner Bros-Horizon. She was consulting producer on American Idol XV, and co-executive producer of two seasons of the Shine America reality competition series, Fake Off for truTV (2014-2015). Also in 2014, she was co-executive producer of the high-rating two-hour NBC television special, The Sing-Off Holiday Special.

From 2007 to 2013, she was senior supervising producer of the NBC series, America's Got Talent.

She has also worked as director or producer on many series and specials, including Fox's network primetime series The Swan and Kitchen Nightmares, Moochers on CBS, Court TV's documentary film, Death of a Beatle; Fox Television’s Bizarre World specials; produced specials for Court TV and Animal Planet. In 2005, she was supervising producer and on-air talent for a short-lived revival of Twentieth Television’s A Current Affair. In 2010, she was executive producer of the TLC series, Inedible to Incredible, starring chef John Besh.

Personal life
Holloway married comedian Jim Davidson in 1987, before divorcing him two years later. She married television and film producer Burt Kearns in 1996. They have two children.

External links
 .
 Video: Alison Holloway in Wish You Were Here
 HTV Talent Show for Holloway

References

1961 births
Living people
Television people from London
American television personalities
American women television personalities
British television newsreaders and news presenters
British reporters and correspondents
Journalists from Bristol
English television presenters
Television personalities from Bristol
English expatriates in the United States